The Uintan North American Stage on the geologic timescale is the North American  faunal stage according to the North American Land Mammal Ages chronology (NALMA), typically set from 46,200,000 to 42,000,000 years BP lasting . It falls within the Eocene epoch, preceded by the Bridgerian and followed by the Duchesnean NALMA stages.

Substages
The Uintan is considered to be contained within the Lutetian sharing the upper boundary and contains the following substages:
Late/Upper Uintan. Lower boundary source of the base of the Uintan (approximate).
Early/Lower Uintan. Upper boundary source of the base of the Duchesnean (approximate)

References

 
Eocene life
Eocene animals of North America